Blue Danube Radio (BDR) was an English-language radio station broadcast by the Österreichischer Rundfunk (ORF).

History
Blue Danube Radio went live on 23 August 1979, created principally for the United Nations community at UNO-City in Vienna. It was popular with many Austrian people too. The name "Blue Danube" was also previously used by the unrelated  radio station operated by American Forces Network (AFN) and the 5th United States Army in the American-occupied zone of Austria between 1945 and 1955. From 1995, it shared airtime with FM4, which eventually completely took over on 1 February 2000. 

Favourite programmes included Continental Breakfast, Soft Sound Café, Drive Time, Today@Six, and Sunday Brunch. Many of the people who worked for BDR moved to FM4. Notables include David Halliwell, Paul Catty, Joe Remick, John Wilde, Joanna Bostock, Jill Zobel, Ellis Hill, Paul Hollingdale, Chris Wisbey, Stuart Freeman, Dale Winton, Graham Knight, Paul Holmes, Steve Allen, John Brocks and Katya Adler. It also aired syndicated Casey Kasem's Top 40 (American hit parade), and a short programme called Passport that encouraged the study of foreign languages.

Frequencies

Burgenland

Carinthia

Lower Austria

Upper Austria

Salzburg

Styria

Tyrol

Vienna

Vorarlberg

See also
 List of radio stations in Austria

References

External links
 ORF Website
 Archive of Friends of BDR

1979 establishments in Austria
2000 disestablishments in Austria
Defunct radio stations in Austria
English-language radio stations
Mass media in Vienna
Radio stations established in 1979
Radio stations disestablished in 2000
ORF (broadcaster)